Alpha Delta Mu is a national social work honor society. It was founded by Dr. J. Lawrence Feagins at Morgan State University in the fall of 1976. It was incorporated in April 1977, in Maryland and became a national organization.

The colors are Black and Silver
Alpha Delta Mu's motto is "Advocate of the People."

Membership

must offer degrees at baccalaureate or higher levels in social work and maintain program accreditation from the Council on Social Work Education.

Membership is offered in the spring of the junior year and members are active in their senior year.

Chapters
As of the publication of the last edition of Baird's Manual (20th ed, 1991), the Society had 88 chapters.

References

Honor societies
Student organizations established in 1976
Former members of Association of College Honor Societies
1979 establishments in Maryland